Patrick Machado Ferreira (born 23 November 1998), simply known as Patrick, is a Brazilian professional footballer who plays as an attacking midfielder for Brasil de Pelotas on loan from the Portuguese club Santa Clara.

Club career

Grêmio
Born in Porto Alegre, Brazil, Patrick joined the Grêmio's Academy at the age of 10 in 2008. Patrick is a youth exponent from Grêmio. He made his league debut on 6 August 2017 against Atlético Mineiro in a 2–0 home win. He replaced Everton after 86 minutes.

Career statistics

Club

Honours
Grêmio
Copa Libertadores: 2017
Recopa Sudamericana: 2018
Campeonato Gaúcho: 2018, 2019, 2020, 2021
Recopa Gaúcha: 2019, 2021

References

External links

Profile at the Grêmio F.B.P.A. website

1998 births
Footballers from Porto Alegre
Living people
Association football midfielders
Brazilian footballers
Grêmio Foot-Ball Porto Alegrense players
Criciúma Esporte Clube players
Grêmio Esportivo Brasil players
C.D. Santa Clara players
Belenenses SAD players
Campeonato Brasileiro Série A players
Campeonato Brasileiro Série B players
Primeira Liga players
Liga Portugal 2 players
Brazilian expatriate footballers
Expatriate footballers in Portugal
Brazilian expatriate sportspeople in Portugal